Monika Fašungová (born 9 April 1988, Bratislava) is a Slovak badminton player. She started playing badminton in 2001, and has join the national team in 2005. In 2009, she won her first national champion in the women's singles event. She competed for Slovakia at the 2012 Summer Olympics.

Achievements

BWF International Challenge/Series
Women's singles

Women's doubles

Mixed doubles

 BWF International Challenge tournament
 BWF International Series tournament

References

External links
 

Slovak female badminton players
1988 births
Living people
Sportspeople from Bratislava
Olympic badminton players of Slovakia
Badminton players at the 2012 Summer Olympics